The Pakistan Roller Hockey National Championship is the biggest Roller Hockey Clubs Championship in Pakistan.

Participating teams in the last season
Punjab Blue and Punjab Yellow from Punjab city and CDGK Cheetas and Karachi King from Sindh.

List of winners

Number of championships by team

External links

Pakistan websites
Blog about Pakistan Hockey

International
 Roller Hockey links worldwide
 Mundook-World Roller Hockey
rink-hockey-news - World Roller Hockey

Roller hockey in Pakistan
P
Pakistan